Coleophora buteella is a moth of the family Coleophoridae. It is found in Yunnan in southern China.

The wingspan is 10–11 mm.

References

buteella
Moths described in 1989
Moths of Asia